Ahmed bin Mubarak or Ahmad bin Mubarak is an Arabic given name or a patronymic name, literally Ahmed, Son of [a person called] Mubarak. Since the introduction of surname, it also in form of Ahmed Al Mubarak, literally Ahmed, descendants of [a person called] Mubarak.

Ahmed Mubarak may refer to:
Ahmed Mubarak Al Khattal (born 1988), Bahraini international footballer
Ahmed Mubarak Al-Mahaijri (born 1985), Omani international footballer
Ahmed Mubarak Al Shafi (born 1974), Qatari international footballer
Ahmed Ishtiaq Mubarak (1948–2013), Malaysian Olympic hurdler
Ahmed ibn Mubarak